Heitor Teixeira Pereira (born November 29, 1960), or Heitor TP, is a Brazilian composer, songwriter, musician, arranger, and record producer. In his career, Pereira has recorded with the band Simply Red and several famous musicians, such as Elton John, Rod Stewart, k.d. lang, Milton Nascimento, and Jack Johnson; and currently works as a film score composer, as well as a musician at Hans Zimmer's studio, he is best known for being the composer of the Despicable Me franchise. Although primarily a guitarist, he also provided backing vocals live for the Simply Red song "Thrill Me".

In 1994, he released a solo album in the UK called Heitor TP, which featured guest appearance from Mick Hucknall on the track "Manchester". Heitor left Simply Red to concentrate on his solo career. He played guitar and composed additional music for soundtracks like Gladiator, Mission: Impossible 2, The Road to El Dorado, Pearl Harbor, I Am Sam, Spirit: Stallion of the Cimarron, Rango, Madagascar and Madagascar: Escape 2 Africa.

In 2003, Pereira contributed the song "Remember Me" for the soundtrack for Something's Gotta Give.

In 2006, Heitor Pereira won a Grammy Award for 'Best Instrumental Arrangement Accompanying a Vocalist' on a version of the song "What Are You Doing the Rest of Your Life?" by Chris Botti and Sting.

In 2011, he played guitar on the soundtrack of the film, Cowboys & Aliens.

Albums 
 Heitor TP (1987)
 Heitor (1994)
 Untold Stories (2001)

Film scores

2000s

2010s

2020s

References

External links 
 
 

1957 births
Animated film score composers
Berklee College of Music alumni
Brazilian composers
Brazilian film score composers
Brazilian guitarists
Brazilian male composers
Brazilian male guitarists
Brazilian rock musicians
Grammy Award winners
Illumination (company) people
Living people
Male film score composers
People from Rio Grande (Rio Grande do Sul)
Simply Red members
Sony Pictures Animation people